William Joseph Broderick (20 May 1877 – 1 June 1957) was an Irish politician and farmer. He was first elected to Dáil Éireann as a Cumann na nGaedheal Teachta Dála (TD) for the Cork East constituency at the 1932 general election. He was re-elected at the 1933 general election but lost his seat at the 1937 general election. At the 1938 general election, he was elected as a Fine Gael TD for the Waterford constituency. At the 1943 general election, he moved to the Cork South-East constituency, and was re-elected for this constituency at the 1944 general election. He did not contest the 1948 general election.

References

1877 births
1957 deaths
Cumann na nGaedheal TDs
Fine Gael TDs
Members of the 7th Dáil
Members of the 8th Dáil
Members of the 10th Dáil
Members of the 11th Dáil
Members of the 12th Dáil
20th-century Irish farmers
Politicians from County Cork